Kemerer may refer to:

 Annie S. Kemerer (1865–1951), American art collector
 Benjamin Tibbets Kemerer (1874–1960), American Episcopalian bishop
 Kemerer Museum of Decorative Arts, a decorative arts museum in Bethlehem, Pennsylvania, United States, founded by Annie S. Kemerer

See also
 Kemer (disambiguation)
 Kemmerer (disambiguation)